Gonzalez Germán Germen Figao (born September 23, 1987) is a Dominican professional baseball pitcher who is a free agent. He previously played in Major League Baseball (MLB) for the New York Mets, Chicago Cubs, and Colorado Rockies.

Career

New York Mets

Germen started the 2013 season with the Las Vegas 51s of the Class AAA Pacific Coast League. He made his major league debut with the Mets on July 12, 2013, in an extra inning game against the Pittsburgh Pirates. He received the loss.

Germen recorded his first major league save on August 16, 2013 against the San Diego Padres, pitching two innings.  Germen ended the 2013 season with a 3.93 earned run average in  innings pitched. Germen also compiled 33 strikeouts, 1 save, and a 1.40 WHIP.

Germen was designated for assignment by the Mets on December 15, 2014.

Chicago Cubs
The Mets traded Germen to the New York Yankees on December 19. He was designated for assignment on January 13, 2015. The Yankees then traded him to the Texas Rangers on January 20, 2015, in exchange for cash considerations. The Rangers then also designated him for assignment, one day later.

Germen was subsequently claimed off waivers by the Chicago Cubs on January 23. They designated him for assignment on February 4 to make room for Drake Britton. The Cubs promoted Germen to the major leagues on April 19.

Colorado Rockies
Germen was claimed off waivers by the Colorado Rockies on July 7, 2015. On August 12, 2016, Germen was designated for assignment, and outrighted to the Albuquerque Isotopes on August 15, 2016.

Orix Buffaloes
On December 13, 2016, Germen signed with the Orix Buffaloes of Nippon Professional Baseball.

On December 2, 2017,  he became free agent.

Chicago White Sox
On January 16, 2018, Germen signed a minor league deal with the Chicago White Sox. He was released on March 24, 2018.

Long Island Ducks
On June 28, 2018, Germen signed with the Long Island Ducks of the Atlantic League of Professional Baseball. He became a free agent following the 2018 season.

Olmecas de Tabasco
On March 4, 2019, Germen signed with the Olmecas de Tabasco of the Mexican League. He was released on May 17, 2019.

Brantford Red Sox
On April 5, 2022, Germen signed with the Brantford Red Sox of the Intercounty Baseball League. He was released on May 5, 2022.

Guerreros de Oaxaca
On July 13, 2022, Germen signed with the Guerreros de Oaxaca of the Mexican League. Germen made 3 starts for Oaxaca, posting a 1-0 record and 4.76 ERA with 16 strikeouts in 17.0 innings pitched. On January 11, 2023, Germen was released.

References

External links

, or NPB

1987 births
Living people
Albuquerque Isotopes players
Binghamton Mets players
Buffalo Bisons (minor league) players
Chicago Cubs players
Colorado Rockies players
Dominican Republic expatriate baseball players in Japan
Dominican Republic expatriate baseball players in Mexico
Dominican Republic expatriate baseball players in the United States
Dominican Summer League Mets players
Gulf Coast Mets players
Iowa Cubs players
Kingsport Mets players
Las Vegas 51s players

Major League Baseball players from the Dominican Republic
Major League Baseball pitchers
New York Mets players
Nippon Professional Baseball pitchers
Olmecas de Tabasco players
Orix Buffaloes players
Savannah Sand Gnats players
St. Lucie Mets players
Toros del Este players